Otilia Brumă (born 13 June 1992 in Suceava, Romania), alias Otilia, is a Romanian playback pop singer. Otilia became interested in music as a child.

Early life
Otilia was born on 13 June 1992 in Suceava, Romania in a poor family. Her mother name is Adriana Brumă.

Music singles 
 Bilionera (2014)

References

Bibliography 
 Suceava: Otilia Brumă - De pe băncile școlii, pe scena muzicii (PORTRET), 6 noiembrie 2010, Adevărul
 „Cel mai celebru artist al anului 2014 în Turcia" e o româncă, 2 martie 2015, Evz Monden
 Otilia Brumă premiată de ambasadorul Turciei, Revista Bravo

1992 births
Living people
Romanian dance musicians
Romanian women pop singers
English-language singers from Romania